2102 Tantalus (1975 YA) is an Apollo asteroid discovered on December 27, 1975, by C. Kowal at Palomar Observatory. It is a Q-type asteroid.

2102 Tantalus is a potentially hazardous asteroid (PHA) because its minimum orbit intersection distance (MOID) is less than 0.05 AU and its diameter is greater than 150 meters. Its orbit is well-determined for the next several hundred years.

It will pass  from Earth on 2038-Dec-27, which is just slightly closer than the 1975-Dec-26 approach of 0.046 AU. The asteroid is about 2–4 km in diameter.

The shape of 2102 Tantalus is estimated to be roughly spherical in outline and fairly symmetrical; the surface is thought to be covered in a fine-grained regolith.

References

External links 
 
 
 

002102
Discoveries by Charles T. Kowal
Named minor planets
002102
002102
19751227